Augusta College may refer to:
Augusta College (Kentucky), a former Methodist college in Augusta, Kentucky
Augusta College (now known as Augusta University) in Augusta, Georgia

See also
Augustana College (disambiguation)